SNK vs. Capcom: Card Fighters Clash is a series of SNK Playmore games between 1999 and 2006 for hand-held consoles. It is a digital collectible card game, spun off from the popular series of fighting games by SNK and Capcom, and also including references to many other kinds of games from both companies. The game uses cards based on Capcom and SNK characters from a variety of earlier games. The first two versions of this game were released for the Neo Geo Pocket Color, and a new version for the Nintendo DS was released in 2007.

SVC: Card Fighters' Clash

The first game in the series, released in 1999 for the Neo Geo Pocket Color handheld console, was the first crossover between SNK and Capcom. Characters in the game are illustrated in the super deformed art style. There are two complementary versions of the game: the SNK version and the Capcom version. Each version of the game has a different starting deck and different exclusive cards that can be obtained, but the gameplay remains the same, with card battles resembling a somewhat simplified version of Magic: The Gathering, in which a maximum of three "creatures" (i.e. fighters) are allowed in each player's field at any given moment and there is no mana to be spent to place them in the field (there are, however, Special Points, SP for short, which are gained as fighters are placed in the field and spent as the players use Action Cards - this game's equivalent of Enchantments - or combined attacks).

SVC: Card Fighters 2 Expand Edition

This Japan-only sequel to SVC: Card Fighters' Clash was released in 2001 for the Neo Geo Pocket Color after Capcom vs. SNK 2. In addition to the 240 character and 60 action cards from the first game, 124 new cards are added, adding cast from Garou: Mark of the Wolves, Samurai Shodown: Warriors Rage, The King of Fighters '99 and 2000 for SNK, and Project Justice, Mega Man Legends, Dino Crisis and Onimusha for Capcom, while also including 40 Reaction cards that can be used during the opponent's attack. Another new feature is special character cards with alternate versions of various characters depicted with regular artwork instead of the super deformed style. Instead of being released as two versions (SNK and Capcom), this game was released as a single version that lets the players decide to either start with a SNK deck or a Capcom deck. It was the last game to be released for the Neo Geo Pocket Color in Japan.  A fan translation for the game exists.

SVC: Card Fighters DS

Release
This Nintendo DS game was released on December 14, 2006 in Japan and was released on April 24, 2007 in the United States. In addition, there are key features:
ADK characters were added to the SNK side, from games like Aggressors of Dark Kombat, Ninja Master's -Haoh-Ninpo-Cho- and the World Heroes series.
 Many newcomers have been added from recent games produced by both companies, such as Capcom's Dante and Phoenix Wright as well as SNK's Yuki and Nagase.
 Power Stone characters are absent from the game.

Game-breaking bug
Almost immediately after the American NDS version was released, an unavoidable bug was discovered in the game. The bug occurs on the ninth floor of the tower, during the second play through. The game crashes after talking to an opponent named Jon, who has to be defeated in order to finish the game. On June 6, SNK announced that the replacement cartridge would be available in stores on June 25 and began the process of implementing a recall. These cartridges have been sent by mail along with a package of five King of Fighters trading cards. The recall ended in January 2008. Fixed versions of the game features a black and white graphic behind the title font on the cartridge's label, while bugged versions feature the label in full color. The other versions of the game did not contain the above-mentioned glitch.

Reception

The game was mostly poorly received. Eurogamer said it was "broken in the literal sense of not working as sold and, as such, must be scored appropriately. That the game underneath the bodged localisation is also, figuratively, a broken shell of what it once was and absolutely nowhere near as good as it should have been, is more than anything, deeply, deeply sad." IGN said it was "Without a doubt one of the biggest letdowns thus far on DS." Game Revolution said that the game "takes everything I remember about playing tradable card games, highlights the bad parts, and then breaks." Famicom Tsūshin scored the game a 25 out of 40.

References

Further reading

External links
Archive of the Snk vs Capcom: Card Fighters official website 
Archive of the Snk vs Capcom: Card Fighters 2 Expand Edition official website 
SNK vs. Capcom: Card Fighter's Clash DS official website 
Card Fighters Project website
SNK Vs. Capcom Card Fighters' Clash 2 Expand Edition English translation

1999 video games
Capcom franchises
SNK vs. Capcom
Neo Geo Pocket Color games
Nintendo DS games
Nintendo DS-only games
SNK franchises
SNK games
SNK Playmore games
Video game franchises
Crossover video games
Digital collectible card games
Video games developed in Japan